The 232nd (Saskatchewan) Battalion, CEF was a unit in the Canadian Expeditionary Force during the First World War.  Based in North Battleford, Saskatchewan, the unit began recruiting in early 1916 in that town and the surrounding district.  After sailing to England in April 1917, the battalion was absorbed into the 15th Reserve Battalion on June 9, 1917.  The 232nd (Saskatchewan) Battalion, CEF had one Officer Commanding: Lieut-Col. R. P. Laurie.

This battalion is perpetuated by The North Saskatchewan Regiment.

External links
Nominal roll

References
 
 Meek, John F. Over the Top! The Canadian Infantry in the First World War. Orangeville, Ont.: The Author, 1971.

Battalions of the Canadian Expeditionary Force
Military units and formations of Saskatchewan
North Battleford
North Saskatchewan Regiment